Jimmy Ghaichem (born 11 April 1984 in Sheffield) is an English footballer, who plays for Afc Mansfield.

Career
Ghaichem is a winger who began his career as a trainee at Mansfield Town before turning professional in 2005. He then had a brief spell at Sheffield Wednesday before joining Peterborough United in 2006. He made three appearances for Peterborough in all competitions and had a loan spell at Rushden & Diamonds before being released at the end of the 2007–08 season.

He then signed for Harrogate Town and made 26 appearances before joining Ilkeston Town in January 2010. He joined Scarborough Athletic in August 2011. Ghaichem made 36 appearances in the 2011–12 season, with his most memorable goal coming in a top of the table clash against Tadcaster Albion. At the end of the season he left to join Frickley Athletic where he made 37 appearances in the 2012-2013 helping them secure their league status with a goal on the final day of the season against Worksop Town. He returned to Scarborough Athletic at the beginning of the 2014-15 campaign. He left Scarborough Athletic in January that year with the side in a play off place. He made 21 starts and scored 3 goals before following ex manager Rudy Funk to Afc Mansfield on a long-term contract.

References

External links
Profile at UpThePosh! The Peterborough United Database

1984 births
Living people
English footballers
Mansfield Town F.C. players
Sheffield Wednesday F.C. players
Peterborough United F.C. players
Rushden & Diamonds F.C. players
Belper Town F.C. players
Buxton F.C. players
Worksop Town F.C. players
Alfreton Town F.C. players
Parkgate F.C. players
Goole A.F.C. players
Harrogate Town A.F.C. players
Ilkeston Town F.C. (1945) players
Frickley Athletic F.C. players
Scarborough Athletic F.C. players
Association football wingers